Scaphiophryne boribory is a species of frogs in the family Microhylidae. It is endemic to eastern Madagascar and only known from the area of its type locality near Fierenana.

Etymology
The specific name boribory is a Malagasy word meaning "rounded", in reference to the stout and rounded body shape of the species.

Description
Adult males measure  and females  in snout–vent length. The body is stout. The head wider than long but less wide than the body. The tympanum is not visible and supratympanic fold is rudimentary only. The arms are moderately slender while the hind limbs are short and rather stout. The finger discs are greatly expanded while those on the toes are only slightly expanded. Skin is smooth (except on the throat) in preserved specimens. Skin appears "oversized", with loose and baggy "fit". The dorsal colour is vivid green, with prominent brown markings with black rims. The finger and toe discs are distinctly reddish. The belly is black with white spots.

Scaphiophryne boribory is similar to Scaphiophryne marmorata and Scaphiophryne spinosa but is larger, lacks tubercles in preserved specimens, and has reddish discs on fingers and toes.

Habitat and conservation
Its natural habitats are flooded forest areas on sandy ground. Presumably it breeds in swamps. It is threatened by loss of its forest habitat caused by subsistence agriculture livestock grazing, timber extraction and charcoaling, spread of invasive eucalyptus, and expanding human settlements. Also over-collecting for the international pet trade might affect it. It is not known from any protected areas.

References

Scaphiophryne
Endemic frogs of Madagascar
Amphibians described in 2003
Taxa named by Frank Glaw
Taxa named by Miguel Vences
Taxonomy articles created by Polbot